is a vertically scrolling shoot'em up arcade game developed by Raizing and published by Eighting in 1996. It was later ported to the Sega Saturn in 1998, and an updated version, Battle Garegga Rev.2016 was released in 2016.

It was followed by a spiritual successor titled Battle Bakraid in 1999.

Gameplay

In addition to the player's main shot, picking up green Option power-ups will add up to four support pods to the craft. The formation of these Options can be changed to one of five presets and there are additional secret formations that can be accessed by dropping a certain number of power-ups before picking up the next. Both shot and options are fired by holding the A button.

Upon killing a regular enemy on the ground, a red Small Bomber token will appear. Picking up enough of these gives the player one Large Bomber token, but the player can use their remaining Small Bombers without a Large Bomber in stock; the duration or strength of the bomb will merely be reduced according to the percentage of a full bomb that was used. Up to five Large Bombers can be in stock at any one time, after which each Small token is worth 100 points.

Power-ups drop randomly from popcorn enemies, along with Medals. Every time a Medal is collected, the next one that spawns will be worth more, from 100 to 10,000 points; however, if a medal falls off the bottom of the screen, the next one to spawn will be of the lowest value.  Medals can also be found upon using a bomb on certain items of scenery.

The game features an adjustable difficulty system that will increase difficulty based on the actions of the player.  Uncontrolled increase of the game's rank can quickly turn it into a manic shooter.  Firing and powering up the main weapon, as well as picking up various items, will increase the difficulty of the game. Losing a life will decrease the difficulty (rank) of the game.  The fewer lives a player has when they die, the more rank is decreased, thus, the game rewards a player who doesn't stock up many lives at a time. Players are thus "forced" to keep themselves powered down, conserve shots, and lose lives on purpose in order to keep the last few stages of the game playable, though it is possible to finish the game in one life given an intricate knowledge of the game's rank system and an ultra-prudent playstyle.

Unlike in most other scrolling shooter games, where bullets are often brightly colored to distinguish from the background, bullets are realistically colored, making it difficult for players to see them. Exploding enemies and objects also create flying debris, further camouflaging incoming fire. This was ameliorated to some extent in the Type 2 version, which replaces most of the standard bullets with yellow dots.

Plot
Mathew Wayne, a resident of a small country town, was a mechanical genius whose aptitude and skills were passed down to his sons, Brian and Jason. After gaining leadership of his automobile factory from him, the brothers' skills became renowned throughout the country. Eventually, the Federation approached the brothers with an extremely profitable contract to help produce military vehicles for it. The Wayne brothers accepted the contract and created weapons without peer.

A short time later, the skies turned dark with the Federation's encroaching airfleet, and towns and cities everywhere were ravaged by these armies—including Brian and Jason's home town. To their horror, the Federation was using the weapons and vehicles they themselves had designed to reshape the land to their pitiless will. Taking up planes whose designs had never been submitted to the Federation, the Wayne brothers prepare to destroy the Federation's mad scheme. They are aided by the four heroes from Mahou Daisakusen.

Development 
Programmer Shinobu Yagawa worked on this game, and he had previously worked on the game Recca in 1992. He would later work on games like Ibara and its sequel, Pink Sweets.

Release 
The original arcade game was released on February 3, 1996, and released on Sega Saturn on February 26, 1998. The Sega Saturn version has become a rare game, and in 2014 it was listed as costing £100 in the United Kingdom. The Saturn version is also the final game on the system, and by extension any Sega console, to be published in any capacity by Electronic Arts.

On December 15, 2016 M2 released a new version of the game called Battle Garegga Rev.2016 to PlayStation 4 as part of their M2 Shot Triggers publishing label. An Xbox One version was released the following year, along with an English version for both platforms.

Reception
In Japan, Game Machine listed Battle Garegga on their March 15, 1996 issue as being the eighth most-successful arcade game of the month.

Three reviewers from the Japanese Sega Saturn Magazine gave it an 8/10 each.

Famitsu gave Battle Garegga Rev.2016, a score of 32 out of 40.

Notes

References

External links 
   (Shift-JIS)
 Battle Garegga at GameFAQs
 Battle Garegga at Killer List of Videogames
 Battle Garegga at MobyGames

1996 video games
Arcade video games
Cooperative video games
Eighting games
Electronic Arts games
Multiplayer and single-player video games
PlayStation 4 games
PlayStation Network games
Sega Saturn games
Science fiction video games
Vertically scrolling shooters
Victor Entertainment games
Video games developed in Japan
Video games scored by Manabu Namiki
Xbox One games